Many US television series are based, copied, or derived from television shows from other countries.

See also
 List of television show franchises

Foreign shows
A
Television shows remade overseas